Aygül Berivan Aslan (born October 16, 1981 in Kulu, Turkey) is a Kurdish-Austrian politician and a member of the Austrian Green Party. She was a member of the National Council from 2013 to 2017.

In 2020, a man named Feyyaz Öztürk claimed that Turkish intelligence officials had blackmailed him and ordered him to assassinate Aslan.

External links

Parliament of Austria biography

References

Living people
Members of the National Council (Austria)
People from Kulu, Konya
University of Innsbruck alumni
1981 births